James I (1321 – 15 November 1347), the eighteenth Count of Urgell, was the fourth son of Alfonso IV King of Aragon and Teresa d'Entença & Cabrera, 17th Countess of Urgell.

Biography
James was born in Zaragoza in 1321.  His older brother, Peter, inherited the Kingdom of Aragon.  James inherited his mother's title.

He married Cecilia de Comminges (1321–1381), the daughter of Bernard VIII, Count of Comminges and Viscount of Turenne, in 1336 in Catalonia.  They had two children, Pedro 19th Conde of Urgel and Isabel.

James is believed to have been poisoned by his brother Peter in Barcelona.

References
 

1321 births
1347 deaths
People from Zaragoza
Counts of Urgell
14th-century people from the Kingdom of Aragon
Aragonese infantes
Sons of kings